Marionia bathycarolinensis is a species of sea slug, a dendronotid nudibranch, a marine gastropod mollusc in the family Tritoniidae.

Distribution
This species was described from two specimens collected in deep water (191–223 m) by a submarine at Mutremdiu 3, Palau, Caroline Islands, .

Ecology
Analysis of the stomach contents suggests that this species feeds on a species of the octocoral Paracis Kükenthal, 1919, Family Plexauridae Gray, 1859.

References

Tritoniidae
Gastropods described in 2018